List of Japanese military attachés in foreign service

Austria-Hungary

Shizuo Matsuoka: military attaché, Austria-Hungary, September 1909
Hisaichi Terauchi: assistant military attaché, Austria-Hungary, December 1911
Tomoyuki Yamashita: military attaché (Lt. Col.), Austria—Hungary, February 1927

Belgium

Yuitsu Tsuchihashi: military attaché, France — and, concurrently, Belgium, August 1937

Canada

Tadamichi Kuribayashi: military attaché, Canada, April 1930

China

Shigeru Honjō: military attaché to China
Seiichi Kita: resident officer, China, February 1921, Resident Officer, China, May 1927
Kenji Doihara: official duty, China, December 1922
Teiichi Suzuki: assistant military attaché, China, December 1929
Yuitsu Tsuchihashi: concurrently military attaché, China, December 1940. Spelled as "Tsuchiachi" in French literature.

Denmark

Tetsuzan Nagata: language officer, Denmark, June 1915;

England

Masaharu Homma: resident officer, also military student, England, August 1918 (and served as observer with British forces in France)
Hitoshi Imamura: assistant military attaché, England, October 1918
Ando Rikichi: resident officer, England, January 1919
Shizuichi Tanaka: resident officer, England, March 1919
Seiichi Kita: resident officer, England, September 1927
Shigenori Kuroda: resident officer, England, January 1922

France

Keisuke Fujie: assistant military attaché, France, August 1917
Naruhiko Higashikuni: resident officer, France, studying military tactics, April 1920
Kanji Nishihara: resident officer, France, February 1926
Korechika Anami: official duty, France, August 1927
Ishiro Shichida: resident officer, France, May 1931
Takushiro Hattori: resident officer, France, June 1934; observer, Italo-Ethiopian War, October 1935
Yuitsu Tsuchihashi: military attaché, France—and, concurrently, Belgium, August 1937. Spelled as "Tsuchiachi" in French.

Germany

Toshizō Nishio: language officer, Germany, August 1912
Tetsuzan Nagata: language officer, Germany, October 1913
Hideki Tōjō: official duty, Germany, July 1921;
Yoshio Kozuki: language officer, Germany, November 1921
Heitarō Kimura: resident officer, Germany, January 1922
Kenzo Kitano: resident officer, Germany, September 1922
Kanji Ishiwara: language officer, Germany, July 1922
Takeo Yasuda: resident officer, Germany, January 1922;
Mitsuo Nakazawa: resident officer, Germany, July 1923;
Sōsaku Suzuki: resident officer, Germany, March 1923
Isamu Yokoyama: resident officer, Germany (Major), August 1924
Takuma Shimoyama: resident officer, Germany, March 1925
Masakazu Kawabe: military attaché Germany, August 1929
Kioji Tominaga: official duty, Germany, December 1935
Hiroshi Ōshima: stationed in Berlin as military attaché working for alliance between Japan and Nazi Germany (Anti-Comintern Pact, 1937; Tripartite Alliance, 1940); Ambassador to Germany, 1940
Kitsuju Ayabe: member, Military Observer Mission to Germany and Italy (under LtGen Yamashita), December 1940-July 1941

India

Gen Sugiyama: military attaché India, February 1915
Masaharu Homma: resident officer, India, August 1922
Hitoshi Imamura: resident officer, India, April 1927
Rikichi Andō: military attaché, India, August 1925
Hideyoshi Obata: resident officer, India, November 1937
Shigenori Kuroda: military attaché, India, August 1935

Italy

Shigetarō Shimada: assistant naval attaché Italy, August 1936; naval attaché, same country, December 1917

Manchukuo

Otosaburo Yano: Japanese military attaché, Hsinking, Manchukuo
Tadashi Hanaya: (head) Japanese military attaché, Hsinking, Manchukuo
Shun Akifusa: (head) Harbin military attaché mission, Manchukuo

Mexico

Shizuichi Tanaka: military attaché, Mexico, May 1926

Philippines

Gen Sugiyama: official duty, Philippines, February 1912
Masafumi Yamauchi: official tor to the Philippines, 1934–1935

Poland

Kiichiro Higuchi: military attaché, Japanese legation, Poland, May 1925
Harukichi Hyakutake: resident officer, Poland, December 1925
Okikatsu Arao: assistant military attaché, Poland, March 1936
Masataka Yamawaki: military attaché to Warsaw, 1934–1935

Singapore

Gen Sugiyama: official duty, Singapore, October 1912

Soviet Union

Sadao Araki: language officer, Russia, November 1909; Military Attaché, Russia, May 1913
Mitsumasa Yonai: resident naval officer, Russia, 1915
Kioji Tominaga: assistant military attaché, USSR, December 1928
Torashirō Kawabe: resident officer, Riga, Latvia (studying Soviet military affairs), January 1926, Military Attaché, U.S.S.R., February 1932 April 1934
Saburo Hayashi: served in the Soviet Union during 1938 as a language officer, later in 1939 was Assistant Military Attaché in Moscow.
Michitake Yamaoka: military attaché to the Soviet Union (1940–1943)

Sweden

Tetsuzan Nagata: military attaché, Sweden, June 1921

Switzerland

Masakazu Kawabe: resident officer, Switzerland, April 1918
Hideki Tōjō: official duty, Switzerland, August 1919
Yoshijirō Umezu: military attaché, Switzerland, November 1919
Kioji Tominaga: member, Japanese Delegation to General Disarmament Conference, Geneva, December 1931
Kanji Ishiwara: member, Japanese Delegation to Geneva Conference, October 1932
Keisuke Fujie: member of Japanese Delegation, General Disarmament Conference, Geneva, August 1931

Turkey

Jo Iimura: military attaché, Turkey, January 1930;
Kingoro Hashimoto: attaché duty, Japanese Embassy, Turkey

United States

Tadamichi Kuribayashi: resident officer, United States, September 1927
Kumaichi Teramoto: assistant military attaché, United States, December 1928
Hisakazu Tanaka: language officer, United States
Shizuichi Tanaka: military attaché, United States, May 1932
Joichiro Sanada: official duty, United States, September 1936-September 1937
Masafumi Yamauchi: military attaché to USA 1938–1939
Hideo Iwakuro: special duty, United States, 1941

Military attaches in Diplomatic missions

Concurrent Mission to Europe
Shizuo Yokoyama: official duty, Europe, September 1934
Joichiro Sanada: official duty, Europe, September 1936-September 1937
Hitoshi Imamura: official duty, Europe, August 1920
Shunroku Hata: official duty, Europe, December
Kenji Doihara: official duty, Europe, May 1921
Rikichi Andō: official duty, Europe, September 1921

Assistant to Peace Conference February 1919 

 Jo Iimura: member, Plenipotentiary's Suite, Peace Conference, February 1919
 Shunroku Hata: member, Plenipotentiary's Suite, Peace Conference, February 1919

Assistant to Mission to League of Nations,1920-23 
Heisuke Yanagawa: member of the Japanese Military Mission to League of Nations during 1920-23 period

Assistant to London Conference 1929-May 30 
Torashirō Kawabe: member, Japanese delegation, London Conference, 1929-May 1930
Heitarō Kimura: member, Japanese delegation, London Conference, 1929-May 1930

Assistant to General Disarmament Conference,Geneva 1931-32 
Keisuke Fujie: member of Japanese delegation, General Disarmament Conference, Geneva, August 1931
Kioji Tominaga: member, Japanese delegation to General Disarmament Conference, Geneva, December 1931
Kanji Ishiwara: member, Japanese delegation to Geneva Conference, October 1932

Assistant to Ho-Umezu Agreement June 1935 
Yoshihiro Umezu: commanding general, China Garrison Army, March 1934 (Ho-Umezu Agreement, June 1935);

Member in Yamashita s Mission to Europe(Germany and Italy),December 1940-July 1941
Kitsuju Ayabe: member, military observer Lt. Gen. Yamashita's diplomatic mission to Germany and Italy in December 1940 - July 1941

Special Military Attaché in Germany
Kazuo Otani: special military Attaché in Germany, official representative for buying armaments, also heavy supporter and liaison with the Nazis

Army attaché in Matsuoka's mission to Europe and Russia
Yatsuji Nagai: Army attaché in Matsuoka's Diplomatic Mission to Europe and Russia

Army  diplomatic support to Washington diplomatic mission
Hideo Iwakuro: Army foreign affairs officer, provided diplomatic support to the Washington mission

Special aide to Nomura Mission to Washington
Kaname Wakasugi: special aide to Nomura Mission to Washington

Military attaches in foreign service